The Premonitory Urge for Tics Scale (PUTS) is a psychological measure used to assess premonitory urges preceding tics in tic disorders.  It is not recommended for children ten and under.

References 

Mental disorders screening and assessment tools
Tourette syndrome